Moyar is a surname. Notable people with the surname include:

 Mark Moyar (born 1971), Senior Advisor at the US Agency for International Development
 Dean Moyar, American philosopher and associate professor of philosophy at Johns Hopkins University

See also
 Moyar, community from Kerala-Karnataka coast